Filippo Sauli (died 1528) was a Roman Catholic prelate who served as Bishop of Brugnato (1512–1528).

Biography
On 14 June 1512, Filippo Sauli was appointed during the papacy of Pope Julius II as Bishop of Brugnato.
He served as Bishop of Brugnato until his death in 1528.

References

External links and additional sources
 (for Chronology of Bishops) 
 (for Chronology of Bishops) 

16th-century Italian Roman Catholic bishops
Bishops appointed by Pope Julius II
1528 deaths